Grethel may refer to:

Grethel, Kentucky, an unincorporated community located in Floyd County
Henry Grethel, an American fashion designer